The Premier Hockey Federation Players' Association (PHFPA, formerly known as the National Women's Hockey League Players' Association) is a representative body for professional ice hockey players in the Premier Hockey Federation (PHF). The association was founded in 2015.

Inaugural season
In 2015, the NWHL (now the PHF) announced that its players' association would consist of two elected players from each team. Erika Lawler served as the director of the players' association in its inaugural season. The elected player representatives during the NWHL's inaugural season were Emily Pfalzer and Meghan Duggan from Buffalo Beauts, Celeste Brown and Taylor Holze from the New York Riveters, Kelli Stack and Kaleigh Fratkin from the Connecticut Whale, and Hilary Knight and Brianna Decker from the Boston Pride.

Current association
As of April 13, 2022, the current executive director of the PHFPA is Nicole Corriero.

References

Sports trade unions of the United States

Women's ice hockey in the United States
Ice hockey organizations
Sports organizations established in 2015
Trade unions established in 2015